Edward Moss (born July 11, 1977), occasionally known as Eddie Moss, is an  American actor, dancer, comedian, and Michael Jackson impersonator who has portrayed Jackson in TV and in films. He used to be an employee at McDonald's in the early 1990s, which was where his co-workers kept telling him that he resembled pop singer Michael Jackson; so Moss entered a company talent contest and won, and then as time went by, he decided to be Jackson for a living.

Early life
Moss was born and raised in Los Angeles, California on July 11, 1977. While an employee at McDonald's in the early 1990s, his co-workers took notice of his resemblance to pop singer Michael Jackson. In 1994, Moss entered an employee talent contest impersonating the singer and won the competition. It was at this time that he decided to become a Jackson impersonator professionally.

Career
Moss has stated it only takes him 30–45 minutes to transform himself into Michael Jackson. His impersonation skills have led to work in countries outside of North America including the Philippines, Bahrain, New Zealand, and Japan. In July 2009, Moss went on a world tour with his Tribute to Michael Jackson show. For four years, Moss performed as Jackson at Horizons Casino Hotel in Lake Tahoe. He performed as a Michael Jackson impersonator at Canobie Lake Park in Salem, New Hampshire for many years.

Moss is also the only known Jackson impersonator to have had no plastic surgery to augment his appearance to more resemble the singer. When hired to perform at a venue in Asia, Moss' manager had to have staff act as bodyguards for him as the audience attending had reached mob levels.

In 1996, Moss met Michael Jackson while performing his impressionist act in Hollywood, California. Reportedly, Jackson told Moss, "You look really good." Moss has impersonated Jackson in a number of movies, including the third and fourth Scary Movie films and Date Movie. Moss also appeared as Michael Jackson on E! Entertainment, Sky News, and Sky 1's reenactment of the Michael Jackson Trial.

A number of Jackson's fans reportedly criticized Moss and his performances as making fun of the singer. Moss denies suggestions that he exploits and portrays Jackson in a negative manner.

Filmography

Film

Television

Awards and nominations

References

External links
 
 
 Myspace page

1977 births
Living people
American impressionists (entertainers)
American male comedians
21st-century American comedians
American male film actors
American male television actors
Michael Jackson impersonators
Cultural depictions of Michael Jackson
Male actors from Los Angeles